Waterside  may refer to:

Placenames

Canada 
RBC Waterside Centre, a commercial development in Halifax, Nova Scotia
Waterside, New Brunswick

United Kingdom
Waterside, East Ayrshire
Waterside, Buckinghamshire
Waterside, Cumbria
Waterside, Derry
Waterside, East Dunbartonshire
Romsey and Waterside, the former name of the Romsey parliament constituency
Waterside, Lancashire

United States
Waterside (Norfolk, Virginia)
Waterside Plaza, a large residential complex located along the East River in Manhattan

Other
Waterside (album), a 2021 album by British singer/songwriter Gary Hughes
Waterside (building), the corporate headquarters of the airline British Airways located at Harmondsworth, UK
Waterside Karori, a current New Zealand football club, formed by the amalgamation of Waterside and Karori Swifts